Wendy Ann Lovell (born 11 August 1959) is an Australian politician. Born in Sydney, New South Wales, she was a newsagent before becoming involved in politics. She held numerous posts with the Liberal Party, and was eventually elected to the Victorian Legislative Council as a Liberal member for North Eastern Province in 2002. Following the re-organisation of the Legislative Council, in 2006 she was a successful candidate for Northern Victoria Region, winning re-election in 2010, 2014 and 2018.

Lovell served as Minister for Housing and Minister for Children and Early Children Development from 2010 to 2014 in the Ballieu and Napthine governments.

From 2010 to 2014 Lovell served as Manager of Government Business in the Legislative Council and was Deputy Leader of the Liberal Party in the Legislative Council from 2007 to 2014. From 2014 to 2018 Lovell was the Opposition Whip in the Legislative Council. Following the 2018 election Lovell was elected Deputy President of the Legislstive Council.

In her early career Ms Lovell also held many Shadow Ministerial portfolios including: Shadow Minister for Women's Affairs December 2002 – February 2008, Shadow Minister for Consumer Affairs May 2006 – August 2007, Shadow Minister for Tourism May 2006 – August 2007, Shadow Minister for Country Victoria December 2006 – December 2010 and Shadow Minister for Housing December 2006 – December 2010.

In March 2022, Lovell made a speech in Parliament arguing public housing should not be built in wealthy areas, stating “There is no point putting a very low income, probably welfare-dependent, family in the best street in Brighton where the children cannot mix with others or go to school with other children or where they do not have the same ability to have the latest sneakers and iPhones.” Lovell's remarks attracted widespread condemnation.

References

External links
 Parliamentary voting record of Wendy Lovell at Victorian Parliament Tracker

1959 births
Living people
Liberal Party of Australia members of the Parliament of Victoria
Members of the Victorian Legislative Council
21st-century Australian politicians
Women members of the Victorian Legislative Council
21st-century Australian women politicians